Ruhan may refer to:

 Ruhan Pretorious (born 1991), South African first-class cricketer.
 Ruhan Işim (born 1970), retired Turkish pole vaulter.
 Andy Ruhan (born 1962), British businessman and motor racing driver.
 Jia Ruhan, Chinese soprano.
 Ruhan Nel (born 1991), South African rugby union player.